Kelanlu (also, Kharaba Këlanlu and Këlanlu) is a town in the Armavir Province of Armenia.

See also
 Ararat Province

References 

Populated places in Armavir Province